The 2000 College Football All-America Team is composed of the following All-American Teams: Associated Press, Football Writers Association of America, American Football Coaches Association, Walter Camp Foundation, The Sporting News, Pro Football Weekly, Football News, Sports Illustrated and Rivals.com.

The College Football All-America Team is an honor given annually to the best American college football players at their respective positions. The original usage of the term All-America seems to have been to such a list selected by football pioneer Walter Camp in the 1890s. The NCAA officially recognizes All-Americans selected by the AP, AFCA, FWAA, TSN, and the WCFF to determine Consensus All-Americans.

Offense

Quarterback
Josh Heupel, Oklahoma (Walter Camp, AFCA-Coaches, FWAA, TSN)
Chris Weinke, Florida State (AP, CNNSI, FN, Rivals)
George Godsey, Georgia Tech (PFW)

Running back
LaDainian Tomlinson, TCU (AP, Walter Camp, AFCA-Coaches, FWAA, TSN, PFW, FN, CNNSI, Rivals)
Damien Anderson, Northwestern (AP, Walter Camp, FWAA, TSN, PFW, FN, CNNSI)
Ken Simonton, Oregon State (AFCA-Coaches, Rivals)

Wide receiver
Marvin Minnis, Florida State (AP, AFCA-Coaches, FWAA, TSN, FN, CNNSI)
Antonio Bryant, Pittsburgh (AP, FWAA, Rivals)
Freddie Mitchell, UCLA (Walter Camp, TSN)
David Terrell, Michigan (PFW, CNNSI, Rivals)
Rod Gardner, Clemson (PFW)
Quincy Morgan, Kansas State (FN)

Tight end
Brian Natkin, UTEP  (AP, Walter Camp, AFCA-Coaches, FWAA, TSN, FN, Rivals)
Todd Heap, Arizona State (PFW, CNNSI)

Tackle
Leonard Davis, Texas  (AP, Walter Camp, FWAA, TSN)
Chris Brown, Georgia Tech ( AP, AFCA-Coaches, FWAA, FN, CNNSI, Rivals)
Chad Ward, Washington ( AP, TSN, CNNSI)
Paul Zukauskas, Boston College (AFCA-Coaches, Rivals)
Joaquin Gonzalez, Miami (Florida) (FWAA)
Bryant McKinnie, Miami (Florida) (PFW, FN, CNNSI)
Matt Light, Purdue (PFW) 
Kenyatta Walker, Florida (PFW)

Guard
Steve Hutchinson, Michigan (AP, Walter Camp, AFCA-Coaches, FWAA, PFW, FN, CNNSI, Rivals)
Russ Hochstein, Nebraska (TSN)
Bill Ferrario, Wisconsin (PFW)

Center
Dominic Raiola, Nebraska (AP, Walter Camp, AFCA-Coaches, FWAA, PFW, RN, CNNSI, Rivals)
Ben Hamilton, Minnesota (Walter Camp, AFCA-Coaches, TSN, FN, Rivals)

Defense

End
Jamal Reynolds, Florida State (AP, Walter Camp, AFCA-Coaches, FWAA, TSN, PFW, FN, CNNSI, Rivals)
Andre Carter, California (AP, Walter Camp, AFCA-Coaches, FWAA, TSN, PFW, FN, CNNSI, Rivals)
Justin Smith, Missouri (FWAA)
Julius Peppers, North Carolina (CNNSI)

Tackle
Casey Hampton, Texas (AP, Walter Camp, AFCA-Coaches, TSN, Rivals)
John Henderson, Tennessee (AP, FWAA, TSN, FN, CNNSI, Rivals)
Richard Seymour, Georgia (Walter Camp, AFCA-Coaches, PFW)
Gerard Warren, Florida (PFW)
Mario Fatafehi, Kansas State (FN)

Linebacker
Rocky Calmus, Oklahoma (AP, Walter Camp, AFCA-Coaches, FWAA, TSN, CNNSI)
Dan Morgan, Miami (Florida) (AP, Walter Camp, AFCA-Coaches, FWAA, TSN, PFW, FN, CNNSI, Rivals)
Keith Adams, Clemson (AP, Walter Camp, TSN, PFW, FN, CNNSI, Rivals)
Carlos Polk, Nebraska (AP, AFCA-Coaches)
Levar Fisher, North Carolina State (FWAA, FN)
Adam Archuleta, Arizona State (PFW)
Torrance Marshall, Oklahoma (Rivals)

Cornerback
Jamar Fletcher, Wisconsin (AP, Walter Camp, AFCA-Coaches, FWAA, PFW, FN, CNNSI, Rivals)
Fred Smoot, Mississippi State (AP, Walter Camp, TSN, PFW, FN)
Tay Cody, Florida State (AFCA-Coaches, TSN, PFW)
Sheldon Brown, South Carolina (AFCA-Coaches)
Lito Sheppard, Florida (FWAA, CNNSI)
Nate Clements, Ohio State (PFW)
Ken Lucas, Ole Miss (Rivals)

Safety
Dwight Smith, Akron (AP, Walter Camp, AFCA-Coaches, FWAA, FN)
Ed Reed, Miami (Florida) (AP, FWAA, CNNSI)
Anthony Floyd, Louisville (Walter Camp)
J.T. Thatcher, Oklahoma (TSN, FN)
Mike Doss, Ohio State (TSN, Rivals)
Hakim Akbar, Washington (CNNSI)
Roy Williams, Oklahoma (Rivals)

Special teams

Kicker
Jonathan Ruffin, Cincinnati (AP, Walter Camp, FWAA, TSN, CNNSI)
Jamie Rheem, Kansas State (AFCA-Coaches, FN)
Alex Walls, Tennessee (Rivals)

Punter
Nick Harris, California (AP, Walter Camp, AFCA-Coaches, PFW)
Brian Morton, Duke (FWAA, TSN, Rivals)
Kevin Stemke, Wisconsin (CNNSI)
Preston Gruening, Minnesota (FN)

All-purpose player / return specialist
Santana Moss, Miami (Florida) (AP, FWAA, TSN, Walter Camp-WR, AFCA-Coaches-WR, Rivals, PFW, CNNSI-AP)
André Davis, Virginia Tech (AFCA-Coaches, CNNSI-PR)
Julius Jones, Notre Dame (CNNSI-KR)

See also
 2000 All-Big Ten Conference football team
 2000 All-Big 12 Conference football team
 2000 All-SEC football team

References
Coaches AA – AFCA
Associated Press – AP
Writers AA – FWAA
Sporting News – TSN
Walter Camp – Walter Camp
PFW (Archived 2009-05-14) – Pro Football Weekly
FN – Football News
CNNSI (Archived 2009-05-14) – Sports Illustrated
Rivals.com- Rivals.com

All-America Team
College Football All-America Teams